Events in 1951 in animation.

Events

January
 January 6: Hanna-Barbera's Tom & Jerry cartoon Casanova Cat premieres, produced by MGM.

February
 February 3: Friz Freleng's Tweety & Sylvester cartoon Canned Feud premieres, produced by Warner Bros. Cartoons.

March
 March 10: Chuck Jones' Bugs Bunny cartoon Bunny Hugged premieres, produced by Warner Bros. Cartoons in which Bugs participates in a wrestling match.
 March 29: 23rd Academy Awards: John Hubley's Gerald McBoing-Boing, produced by UPA, wins the Academy Award for Best Animated Short.

April
 April 7: Hanna-Barbera's Tom & Jerry cartoon Jerry's Cousin premieres, produced by MGM.

May
 May 19: Chuck Jones' Bugs Bunny and Daffy Duck short Rabbit Fire premieres, produced by Warner Bros. Cartoons, the first short in his Hunting Season trilogy. It also marks a significant change in Daffy's personality, where the originally mad character now transforms into a more selfish, unsympathetic loser.
 May 26: Hanna-Barbera's Tom & Jerry short Sleepy-Time Tom premieres, produced by MGM.

June
 June 16: 
 Chuck Jones' Chow Hound premieres, produced by Warner Bros. Cartoons.
 Tex Avery's Symphony in Slang premieres, produced by MGM.

July
 July 26: The Walt Disney Company releases Alice in Wonderland, produced by Clyde Geronimi, Wilfred Jackson and Hamilton Luske.

Fall
 The U.S. government educational short Duck and Cover, by Anthony Rizzo, begins airing in U.S. schools. The film teaches children what to do in case of a nuclear attack and features an animated sequence starring Bert the Turtle.

November
 November 15: John Hubley's Rooty Toot Toot, produced by UPA, premieres.
 November 17: 
 Chuck Jones' Daffy Duck cartoon Drip-Along Daffy premieres,  produced by Warner Bros. Cartoons. It marks the debut of recurring villain Nasty Canasta.
 Tex Avery's Droopy cartoon Droopy's Double Trouble premieres, produced by MGM in which confusion arises around Droopy's twin brother.

December
 December 29: Jack Kinney's Goofy cartoon No Smoking, produced by the Walt Disney Company, premieres. It is controversial and rarely broadcast because the plot revolves around Goofy trying to quit smoking.

Specific date unknown
 Valentina and Zinaida Brumberg's The Night Before Christmas premieres.

Films released

 January 13 - Amazon Symphony (Brazil)
 January 26 - Prince Bayaya (Czechoslovakia)
 July 26 - Alice in Wonderland (United States)
 December 31 - The Night Before Christmas (Soviet Union)

Births

January
 January 12: Rush Limbaugh, American conservative political commentator (voice of a Galactical Political Commentator and The Rancor in the Family Guy episodes "Blue Harvest" and "It's a Trap!", voiced himself in the Family Guy episode "Excellence in Broadcasting"), (d. 2021).
 January 30: Phil Collins, English drummer and musician (wrote and sang the songs in Tarzan and Brother Bear), and actor (voice of Muk and Luk in Balto, Lucky in The Jungle Book 2).

February
 February 5:
 John Callahan, American cartoonist (creator of Pelswick and John Callahan's Quads!), (d. 2010).
 Robin Sachs, English actor (voice of Silver Surfer in Fantastic Four, Sergeant Sam Roderick in the SpongeBob SquarePants episode "Mrs. Puff, You're Fired"), (d. 2013).
 February 13: David Naughton, American actor and singer (voice of Commander Locke and Dr. Noah in Sky Blue, The Streak in the Justice League episode "Legends", Orchestra Conductor Hero in the Higglytown Heroes episode "Higgly Harmonies", himself in the SuperMansion episode "Comicarnage").
 February 15:
 Melissa Manchester, American musician and actress (voice of Miss Kitty in The Great Mouse Detective, Ms. Euphrosyne in Hercules, Jane Green in the Captain Planet and the Planeteers episode "Dirty Politics").
 Paul Kandel, American actor (voice of Clopin Trouillefou in The Hunchback of Notre Dame and The Hunchback of Notre Dame II).
 February 16:
 Laurie O'Brien, American actress (voice of Miss Piggy in Muppet Babies).
 William Katt, American actor and musician (voice of Hawkman in the Batman: The Brave and the Bold episode "The Golden Age of Justice!", Green Guardman in the Justice League episode "Legends", Zowie in the Batman: The Animated Series episode "Riddler's Reform").
 February 22: 
 Ellen Greene, American actress and singer (voice of Goldie in Rock-a-Doodle, Dolly Gopher in Re-Animated and Out of Jimmy's Head, Creeping Ivy in The Magic of Herself the Elf, Mrs. Sugarby in the Tangled: The Series episode "Painter's Block", Mrs. Manface in the Batman: The Brave and the Bold episode "Night of the Huntress!", Gertrude Washburn in the Pound Puppies episode "Olaf in Love").
 Patty Shinagawa, American retired animator (Fred Wolf Films, A Family Circus Christmas, The Chipmunk Adventure, Snoopy: The Musical, The Critic), storyboard artist (The Little Clowns of Happytown, King of the Hill), sheet timer (Film Roman, Recess: School's Out, What's New, Scooby-Doo?, Family Guy, Ni Hao, Kai-Lan, American Dad!), writer (The Twisted Tales of Felix the Cat) and director (Film Roman, The Angry Beavers, Futurama, Grim & Evil).

March
 March 17: Kurt Russell, American actor (voice of adult Copper in The Fox and the Hound, Ego the Living Planet in What If...?).
 March 18: Bruce Baum, American comedian (voiced himself in The Simpsons episode "The Last Temptation of Krust").
 March 19:
 Kathy Gori, American actress (voice of Rosemary in Hong Kong Phooey, Katie Butler in Valley of the Dinosaurs, Laurie in Inch High Private Eye, Laurie Partridge in Partridge Family 2200 AD).
 Bob Gardiner, American animator (co-director of Closed Mondays) and inventor (Claymation), (d. 2005). 
 March 26: John Pomeroy, American animator, producer, writer and director (Walt Disney Animation Studios, Sullivan Bluth Studios, Warner Bros. Animation).

April
 April 11: Dennis Snee, American screenwriter (wrote The Simpsons episode "Special Edna"), (d. 2019).
 April 17: Olivia Hussey, English actress (voice of Talia al Ghul in Superman: The Animated Series and Batman Beyond).
 April 21: Tony Danza, American actor (voice of Siggy in Rumble, himself in the King of the Hill episode "Peggy's Fan Fair" and the Family Guy episode "Ready, Willing and Disabled").
 April 24: Steven Lisberger, American film director, producer and writer (Tron, Animalympics).

May
 May 5: Nicholas Guest, English-American actor (voice of Clancy in Ben 10, Martian Manhunter and Question in Batman: The Brave and the Bold).
 May 14:
 Robert Zemeckis, American filmmaker (Who Framed Roger Rabbit, The Polar Express, Monster House, Beowulf, A Christmas Carol, Mars Needs Moms, Pinocchio).
 Jim McLean, American animator and storyboard artist (Warner Bros. Animation, Disney Television Animation, He-Man and the Masters of the Universe, Denver, the Last Dinosaur, BraveStarr, Spider-Man), (d. 2018).
 May 16: Unsho Ishizuka, Japanese voice actor (voice of Jet Black in Cowboy Bebop, Mr. Satan in the Dragon Ball franchise, Van Hohenheim in Fullmetal Alchemist: Brotherhood, Zabuza Momochi in Naruto, Joseph Joestar in JoJo's Bizarre Adventure: Stardust Crusaders, narrator and Professor Oak in Pokemon), (d. 2018).
 May 18:
 James Stephens, American actor (additional voices in Courage the Cowardly Dog).
 Denny Dillon, American actress and comedian (voice of Mrs. Hula in Bobby's World, Glyptodon in Ice Age, Jessy in the Batman: The Animated Series episode "Cat Scratch Fever", additional voices in Problem Child and Courage the Cowardly Dog).
 May 19: Joey Ramone, American musician and member of the Ramones (voiced himself in The Simpsons episode "Rosebud"), (d. 2001).
 May 21: Ben Hurst, American television writer (DIC Entertainment, Tiny Toon Adventures), (d. 2010).
 May 28: Gordon Bressack, American television producer and writer (Hanna-Barbera, Bionic Six, DuckTales, DIC Entertainment, Warner Bros. Animation, Teenage Mutant Ninja Turtles, Darkwing Duck, Mighty Max, Fat Dog Mendoza, The Adventures of Jimmy Neutron, Boy Genius, WordGirl, The Twisted Whiskers Show, Octonauts, creator of Captain Simian & the Space Monkeys), (d. 2019).
 May 30: Stephen Tobolowsky, American actor (voice of Eric Anderson in Life with Louie, Martin Stein in Justice League Action, Calculator in The Brave Little Toaster Goes to Mars, Uncle Ubb in The Lorax, Ron the Manager in Toy Story of Terror!, Principal Purdy in Mr. Peabody & Sherman, Andy Gunderson in Scooby-Doo! Shaggy's Showdown, Principal Huggins in The Loud House, Chad in the Green Eggs and Ham episode "House", Driller in the ThunderCats Roar episode "Driller", Numericles in the Hercules episode "Hercules and the Techno Greeks", Gil in the Buzz Lightyear of Star Command episode "Mindwarp", Dr. Benson and Burt Halverstrom in the King of the Hill episode "The Exterminator", Troll in the American Dragon: Jake Long episode "Adventures in Troll-Sitting", Mr. Geekman in the Pound Puppies episode "Taboo", Stephen in the We Bare Bears episode "Tubin").

June
 June 2: Michael E. Uslan, American lawyer and film producer (Warner Bros. Animation, Dinosaucers, Where on Earth Is Carmen Sandiego?).
 June 6: Ralph Guggenheim, American video graphics designer and film producer (Toy Story).
 June 9: James Newton Howard, American composer and music producer (Walt Disney Animation Studios, Space Jam, Gnomeo & Juliet).
 June 13: Stellan Skarsgård, Swedish actor (voice of Pelle Swanson in Peter-No-Tail in Americat, Ralph Parker in Metropia, Moominpapa and Hemulens in Moomins and the Comet Chase and Moomins and the Winter Wonderland, Gordon in Gordon & Paddy, himself in The Simpsons episode "Podcast News").
 June 16: Paul McGuinness, American industry executive and manager of U2 (voiced himself in The Simpsons episode "Trash of the Titans").
 June 20: Tress MacNeille, American voice actress (voice of Chip and Gadget Hackwrench in Chip 'n Dale: Rescue Rangers, Dot and Hello Nurse in Animaniacs, Agnes Skinner in The Simpsons, Babs Bunny in Tiny Toon Adventures, Charlotte Pickles in Rugrats, Callie Briggs in SWAT Kats: The Radical Squadron, Debbie Douglas and Cobra Queen in Freakazoid!, Mom in Futurama, Fang in Dave the Barbarian, continued voice of Daisy Duck and Wilma Flintstone).
 June 24: Mark Klastorin, American voice actor (voice of Bob, Skipper, Man in White and Yuppie Dad in Aaahh!!! Real Monsters, Truckee and other various characters in The Angry Beavers, Fisherman, Ned, Cop #2 and Old Man in Johnny Bravo, Vinnie in Happy Feet, Paul Teutul Sr. in the Celebrity Deathmatch episode "Stand-up vs. Smack Down") and television writer (Back to the Future), (d. 2012).

July
 July 1: Fred Schneider, American musician and member of The B-52's (voice of one of the Baby Singers in The Rugrats Movie, Betty the Bank Teller in The Cleveland Show episode "The Blue, the Gray and the Brown", Danny Dazzleduff in the Captain Planet and the Planeteers episode "Greed Is the Word", performed the theme songs of Rocko's Modern Life and The Groovenians, and the song "Glove Slap" in The Simpsons episode "E-I-E-I-(Annoyed Grunt)").
 July 4:
 Vincent Marzello, American actor (voice of Farmer Pickles and Robert in Bob the Builder), (d. 2020).
 Frank Weiss, American animator, sheet timer (Adelaide Productions, Life with Louie, Princess Gwenevere and the Jewel Riders, X-Men: The Animated Series, Happily Ever After: Fairy Tales for Every Child, Warner Bros. Animation, Disney Television Animation, Curious George, Brickleberry, Cartoon Network Studios, Bordertown, Dawn of the Croods, Harvey Girls Forever!, Chicago Party Aunt), xerographer (The Berenstain Bears' Christmas Tree), production manager (Duckman) and director (Cow and Chicken, Hey Arnold!, SpongeBob SquarePants).
 July 6:
 Geoffrey Rush, Australian actor (voice of Ezylryb in Legend of the Guardians: The Owls of Ga'Hoole, Nigel in Finding Nemo, Bunyip Bubblegum in The Magic Pudding, narrator in Harvie Krumpet).
 Allyce Beasley, American actress (voice of Girl Cats #2 and #3 in Garfield on the Town, Beazer in Pound Puppies, Mrs. Grotke in Recess, Tia in the Darkwing Duck episode "U.F. Foe", Bess in the Extreme Ghostbusters episode "Witchy Woman", Ground Finch and Penguins in The Wild Thornberrys episode "Eliza-cology", herself in the Johnny Bravo episode "Some Walk by Night", additional voices in All-New Dennis the Menace, Duckman and Lloyd in Space, announcer for Playhouse Disney).
 July 7: Roz Ryan, American actress and comedian (voice of Thalia in the Hercules franchise and the Mickey Mouse Funhouse episode "Daisy and the Muses", Cake in Adventure Time, Madam President in Buzz Lightyear of Star Command, Wade's Mom in Kim Possible, Bubbie in The Marvelous Misadventures of Flapjack, Ms. Fitzpatrick in Kick Buttowski: Suburban Daredevil, Witch Lezah in The Looney Tunes Show, Gorgeous G in the Scooby-Doo! Mystery Incorporated episode "The Night the Clown Cried II: Tears of Doom", Cow in the Mickey Mouse episode "Movie Time", Steel Magnolia in the Mighty Magiswords episode "Suitable Armor", Cyborg's Grandma Voice in the Teen Titans Go! episode "Grandma Voice").
 July 8: Anjelica Huston, American actress (voice of Magda in Arctic Dogs, Queen Usurna in Trollhunters: Tales of Arcadia, Julienne in All Hail King Julien, Angela Diaz in BoJack Horseman, Mrs. D'Abondo in Spirit of the Forest, Ellen Riggs in American Dad!, Gothel in Barbie as Rapunzel).
 July 9: Chris Cooper, American actor (voice of Smokey in Cars 3).
 July 10: Phyllis Smith, American actress and casting associate (voice of Sadness in Inside Out, narrator in The Princess and the Goblin).
 July 12: Brian Grazer, American screenwriter and film and television producer (The PJs, Curious George, Who Are You, Charlie Brown?, The Tiny Chef Show, voiced himself in The Simpsons episodes "When You Dish Upon a Star" and "Lost Verizon").
 July 13: Didi Conn, American actress (voice of Raggedy Ann in Raggedy Ann & Andy: A Musical Adventure, Cupcake in The Fonz and the Happy Days Gang, Spice in Star Fairies, Stella in A Flintstone Family Christmas, Mrs. Goldberg in Stanley, Melissa in The Jetsons episode "Judy Takes Off", Caroller in the Rugrats episode "Babies in Toyland Part 1", Muskox #2 in The Wild Thornberrys episode "Clash and Learn", Oldest Annacille in the Welcome to the Wayne episode "Some Sort of Bad Luck Curse").
 July 18: Margo Martindale, American actress (voice of Mrs. Brinson in My Entire High School Sinking Into the Sea, Louise "Barnstormer" Nash in Cars 3, Ma Beagle in DuckTales, Judge Morpho in Infinity Train).
 July 21:
 Robin Williams, American actor and comedian (portrayed himself in the SpongeBob SquarePants episode "Truth or Square", voice of Mork in Mork & Mindy/Laverne & Shirley/Fonz Hour, Genie in Aladdin, Aladdin and the King of Thieves and Great Minds Think 4 Themselves, The Kiwi in A Wish for Wings That Work, Batty Koda in FernGully: The Last Rainforest, Fender Pinwheeler in Robots, Ramón and Lovelace in Happy Feet and Happy Feet Two), (d. 2014).
 Lillias White, American actress and singer (voice of Calliope in the Hercules franchise and the Mickey Mouse Funhouse episode "Daisy and the Muses").
 July 25: Michel Lyman, American animator (The Little Rascals Christmas Special, A Family Circus Christmas, A Chipmunk Christmas, The Mighty Kong), storyboard artist (DIC Entertainment), sheet timer (Film Roman, DIC Entertainment, Klasky Csupo, Nickelodeon Animation Studio, Hyperion Pictures, Adelaide Productions, All Dogs Go to Heaven: The Series, Family Guy, Mike, Lu & Og, Generation O!, Disney Television Animation, The Cramp Twins, Warner Bros. Animation, Stripperella, American Dad!, Cartoon Network Studios, LeapFrog, Brickleberry, Madea's Tough Love, Bordertown, Dawn of the Croods, She-Ra and the Princesses of Power, Guardians of the Galaxy), lip sync artist (Mike, Lu & Og, King of the Hill, Tron: Uprising, Guardians of the Galaxy), animatic editor (Adventure Time), production manager (The California Raisin Show), producer (The Legend of Prince Valiant) and director (The Legend of Prince Valiant, The Real Adventures of Jonny Quest, The Angry Beavers, Phantom 2040, C Bear and Jamal, The Grim Adventures of Billy & Mandy, Sym-Bionic Titan), (d. 2018).
 July 28: Danny Mann, American actor (voice of Sparky in Planes and Planes: Fire & Rescue, Serge in the Open Season franchise, Albert Einstein and Harry Houdini in Time Squad, Dinosaur Neil in The Tick, Hector in Heathcliff).

August
 August 3: Jay North, American actor (voice of Prince Turhan in the Arabian Knights segment of The Banana Splits, Terry Dexter in Here Comes the Grump, Bamm-Bamm Rubble in The Pebbles and Bamm-Bamm Show, himself in The Simpsons episode "Take My Wife, Sleaze").
 August 12: Hiroshi Ogawa, Japanese animator (Shin-Ei Animation) and film director (Crayon Shin-chan), (d. 2013).
 August 14: Carl Lumbly, American actor (voice of Martian Manhunter in the DC Animated Universe and Justice League: Doom, Anansi in Static Shock, Stalker in Batman Beyond, Silas Stone in Justice League: Gods and Monsters, Tornado Tyrant in the Batman: The Brave and the Bold episode "Hail the Tornado Tyrant!", William Marcus in The Real Adventures of Jonny Quest episode "Other Space").
 August 17: Wesley Eure, American actor, singer, author, director, educator and producer (Dragon Tales).
 August 22: Earl Kress, American animation historian, storyboard artist (The Kwicky Koala Show, The Addams Family) and screenwriter (Fat Albert and the Cosby Kids, The Fox and the Hound, Hanna-Barbera, The Transformers, The Berenstain Bears, Ghostbusters, Warner Bros. Animation, Mother Goose and Grimm, Disney Television Animation, The New Woody Woodpecker Show, Winx Club, The X's, Monster Allergy, Geronimo Stilton), (d. 2011).

September
 September 3: Lou Richards, American actor (voice of Leader-1 in Challenge of the GoBots, Galtar in Galtar and the Golden Lance, Flash Gordon in Defenders of the Earth).
 September 4: Scott Shaw, American comic book artist, animator, storyboard artist (DIC Entertainment, Warner Bros. Animation, Disneytoon Studios, Muppet Babies, Film Roman, Fantastic Four, Hey Arnold!, The Secret Files of the Spy Dogs, Mickey's Once Upon a Christmas, Rocket Power, The Tangerine Bear, American Dragon: Jake Long, Tutenstein, The High Fructose Adventures of Annoying Orange), character designer (Hanna-Barbera, Duck Dodgers), writer (Hanna-Barbera) and producer (The Completely Mental Misadventures of Ed Grimley, Camp Candy).
 September 5: Michael Keaton, American actor (voice of the title character in Porco Rosso, Chick Hicks in Cars, Ken in Toy Story 3, Walter Nelson in Minions, Jack Crowley in The Simpsons episode "Pokey Mom", Trip Larsen in the King of the Hill episode "Pigmalion").
 September 10: Steve Kehela, American actor (voice of Monstar BLANKO and Announcer in Space Jam, Dr. Zan'dozz Zeeltor in Men in Black: The Series, Krusty Krab Training Video Narrator and TV Narrator in SpongeBob SquarePants, Ricky, Sergeant O'Larry, Brick Buster and Narrator in ChalkZone, additional voices in Curious George).
 September 13: 
 Harvey Cohen, American composer and orchestrator (Walt Disney Animation Studios, Warner Bros. Animation), (d. 2007).
 Jean Smart, American actress (voice of Asako Tsukishima in Whisper of the Heart, Maggie Foley in Static Shock, Pickles Oblong in The Oblongs, Ann Possible in Kim Possible, Depression Kitty in Big Mouth, Miriam Bullock in the American Dad! episode "One Little Word", Helen Ventrix in the Batman: The Animated Series episode "See No Evil").
 September 14: Alan Decker, American re-recording mixer (Dragon Tales, Jackie Chan Adventures, Max Steel, Harold and the Purple Crayon, The Simpsons), (d. 2020).
 September 15: Fred Seibert, American television producer (Hanna-Barbera, founder of Frederator Studios).
 September 17: Cassandra Peterson, American actress, writer, and singer (voice of Elvira in Scooby-Doo! Return to Zombie Island and Happy Halloween, Scooby-Doo!, Drella Diabolique in Lego Scooby-Doo! Haunted Hollywood, Lirrak in Dota: Dragon's Blood, Amber in The Haunted World of El Superbeasto, Severina in the Super Robot Monkey Team Hyperforce Go! episode "Season of the Skull", Queen in the JJ Villard's Fairy Tales episode "Snow White).
 September 19: Ralph Farquhar, American producer and writer (The Proud Family, The Proud Family: Louder and Prouder).
 September 21:
 Carl Macek, American actor, writer, and producer (English dub of Robotech), (d. 2010).
 Otis Day, American actor (additional voices in the Drawn Together episode "Toot Goes Bollywood").
 September 25: Mark Hamill, American actor (voice of Joker in the DC Animated Universe, The Killing Joke, Justice League Action and Scooby-Doo and Guess Who?, Luke Skywalker in The Star Wars Holiday Special and Star Wars Forces of Destiny, Fire Lord Ozai in Avatar: The Last Airbender, Skips in Regular Show, Solomon Grundy in Justice League, Abraham Kane in Motorcity, Trickster in Justice League Unlimited and Justice League Action, Tony Zucco in The Batman, Spectre in Batman: The Brave and the Bold, Hobgoblin in Spider-Man, Colonel Muska in Castle in the Sky, Stickybeard in Codename Kids Next Door, Larry 3000 in Time Squad, Skeletor in Masters of the Universe: Revelation, Ferris Boyle in the Batman: The Animated Series episode "Heart of Ice", Darth Bane in the Star Wars: The Clone Wars episode "Sacrifice", himself in The Simpsons episode "Mayored to the Mob", the Freakazoid! episode "And Fanboy Is His Name", several episodes of Pepper Ann, the Scooby-Doo and Guess Who? episode "The Sword, The Fox, and the Scooby Doo!", and the Justice League Action episode "Missing The Mark").
 September 27: Phil Tippett, American film director and visual effects designer (Star Wars Trilogy, Dragonslayer, RoboCop, Dinosaur!, Mad God, founder of Tippett Studio).

October
 October 2: Sting, English musician, composer (The Emperor's New Groove) and actor (voice of Zarm in Captain Planet and the Planeteers, himself in Bee Movie and The Simpsons episode "Radio Bart", performed "My Funny Friend and Me" in The Emperor's New Groove).
 October 26: Peter S. Seaman, American screenwriter and producer (Who Framed Roger Rabbit, Shrek the Third).
 October 28:
 Renato Cecchetto, Italian actor (dub voice of Hamm in Toy Story, P.T. Flea in A Bug's Life, Shrek in the Shrek franchise, The Abominable Snowman in Monsters, Inc. and Monsters University, School of Moonfish in Finding Nemo, Uncle Max in The Lion King 1½, Mack in Cars, Mustafa in Ratatouille, John in WALL-E, Tom in Up, Mr. Trout in The Boxtrolls, Razaq in The Breadwinner, Meow Meow Fuzzyface in BoJack Horseman, Fritz in Inside Out, Earl in The Good Dinosaur, Bill in Finding Dory, Juan Ortodoncia in Coco, Cleveland Brown in seasons 12-19 of Family Guy, Mr. Ellingboe in Klaus), (d. 2022).
 Samuel C. Crutcher, American sound editor (Quest for Camelot, Futurama, The PJs, Dilbert, Mission Hill).
October 30: Harry Hamlin, American actor (voice of Anthony Romulus and Cameron Kaiser in Batman: The Animated Series, Sir Lymon in The Legend of Prince Valiant episode "The Traitor").
October 31: Randy Cartwright, American animator and writer (Walt Disney Animation Studios, DreamWorks Animation, Warner Bros. Animation).

November
 November 2: Ginny McSwain, American voice director (Disney Television Animation, Nickelodeon Animation Studio, The Batman, Ozzy & Drix, Rocket Power, Bobby's World, The Mask: Animated Series, Earthworm Jim).
 November 9: Lou Ferrigno, American actor and retired professional bodybuilder (voice of the Hulk in The Incredible Hulk, Billy and Bobby in Adventure Time, Paul in the We Bare Bears episode "Yard Sale").
 November 15: Beverly D'Angelo, American actress (voice of Darlene in Hair High, Interrogator Wright in Battle for Terra, Mom and Sheila Altoonian in Scooby-Doo! Mystery Incorporated, Lurleen Lumpkin in The Simpsons episodes "Colonel Homer" and "Papa Don't Leech", Ellen Griswold in the Family Guy episode "Blue Harvest").
 November 16: Miguel Sandoval, American actor (voice of El Toro Fuerte in Jackie Chan Adventures, Enrique in Solar Opposites, Principal Aguilar in Static Shock, Ose Martelo in the Generator Rex episode "Outpost", Dr. Arroyo in The Zeta Project episode "His Maker's Name").
 November 17: Stephen Root, American actor (voice of Bill Dauterive and Buck Strickland in King of the Hill, Bubbles in Finding Nemo and Finding Dory, Penguin and Woozy Winks in Batman: The Brave and the Bold, Bud Gleeful in Gravity Falls, Master Junjie in Kung Fu Panda: Legends of Awesomeness, Mildew in Dragons: Riders of Berk, Mayor Toadstool in Amphibia, Revered Amos Howell/Unity in the Superman: The Animated Series episode "Unity", Val-Yor in the Teen Titans episode "Troq").
 November 20: Rodger Bumpass, American actor and comedian (voice of Squidward Tentacles in SpongeBob SquarePants, Professor Membrane in Invader Zim, Louis Tully in The Real Ghostbusters, Grumbles Grizzly in Bonkers, Doctor Light in Teen Titans and Teen Titans Go!, Chief in Where on Earth Is Carmen Sandiego?).
 November 23: David Rappaport, English actor (voice of MAL in Captain Planet and the Planeteers), (d. 1990).
 November 29: Carl Finch, American musician and member of Brave Combo (Dragon Ball, Case Closed, Click and Clack's As the Wrench Turns, provided additional music for the Futurama episode "Fun on a Bun", voiced himself in The Simpsons episode "Co-Dependents' Day").

December
 December 1:
 Obba Babatundé, American actor, director, producer and singer (voice of Conroy in Rocket Power, Boko in The Wild Thornberrys Movie, Chief Ankamuti in Kangaroo Jack: G'Day U.S.A.!, King Teredor in Winx Club, Judge and Bibliobot in All-Star Superman).
 Treat Williams, American actor (voice of Professor Milo in Batman: The Animated Series, himself in The Simpsons episode "A Totally Fun Thing That Bart Will Never Do Again").
 December 2: Kevin Hopps, American television producer (Quack Pack) and writer (Hanna-Barbera, Disney Television Animation, Warner Bros. Animation, Rudolph the Red-Nosed Reindeer and the Island of Misfit Toys, Make Way for Noddy, The Zula Patrol, Cartoon Network Studios, A.T.O.M., W.I.T.C.H., Zorro: Generation Z, Johnny Test, Hellboy Animated, WordGirl, The Spectacular Spider-Man, Wolverine and the X-Men, Zevo-3, Kaijudo, Hulk and the Agents of S.M.A.S.H., Miles from Tomorrowland, Star Wars Rebels, Shimmer and Shine, Octonauts, Muppet Babies, Esme & Roy, Octonauts: Above & Beyond).
 December 16: Deborah Pratt, American actress, television producer and writer (Our Friend, Martin).
 December 24: Paul and Gaetan Brizzi, French twin artists, painters, illustrators, animators and film directors.
 December 29: Andy Gaskill, American animator, art director, and storyboard artist (Walt Disney Animation Studios).
 December 31: Tom Hamilton, American musician and member of Aerosmith (voiced himself in The Simpsons episode "Flaming Moe's").

Specific date unknown
 Paul Christie, American voice actor (voice of Stick Stickly in Nick in the Afternoon, Moose A. Moose in Moose and Zee, Ram #1 in Brother Bear, C.A.R.R. in Stroker and Hoop, Antiques Roadkill Show Host and Jerry the First Caller in Click and Clack's As the Wrench Turns, James Mattis and White Supremacist in Our Cartoon President, additional voices in Osmosis Jones).
 Richard Bowman, American animator, director (ChalkZone, Danny Phantom) and sheet timer (X-Men, The Simpsons, Jim Henson's Muppet Babies, Captain Planet and the Planeteers, Æon Flux, Men in Black: The Series, My Friends Tigger & Pooh), (d. 2021).
 Jeff Kwitny, American television writer (DIC Entertainment, Warner Bros. Animation, Cow and Chicken).

Deaths

April
 April 5: Harry Hemsley, English comedian, radio presenter, comics artist, illustrator, actor and animator (made a 1940 animated short based on the characters from his Ovaltiney's Concert Party radio show and comics which he also voiced himself), dies at age 73.

May
 May 5: Larry Grey, English magician (voice of Bill the Lizard in Alice in Wonderland), dies at age 56.

June
 June 3: Rollin Hamilton, American animator (Walt Disney Company, Warner Bros. Animation), dies at age 52.

July
 July 2: Sam Cobean, American cartoonist (Walt Disney Animation Studios, The Fox and the Crow), dies at age 37.

August
 August 14: William Randolph Hearst, American newspaper publisher and animation producer (founder of International Film Service), dies at age 88.

See also
List of anime by release date (1946–1959)

References

External links 
Animated works of the year, listed in the IMDb